The Light Fantastic is a comic fantasy novel by Terry Pratchett, the second of the Discworld series.  It was published on 2 June 1986, the first printing being of 1,034 copies. The title is taken from L'Allegro, a poem by John Milton, and refers to dancing lightly with extravagance.

The events of the novel are a direct continuation of those in the preceding book, The Colour of Magic.

Plot summary
The book begins shortly after the ending of The Colour of Magic, with wizard Rincewind, Twoflower and the Luggage falling from the Discworld. They are saved when the Octavo, the most powerful book of magic on the Discworld, readjusts reality to prevent the loss of one of its eight spells, which has resided in Rincewind's head since his expulsion from Unseen University: Rincewind, Twoflower and the Luggage end up in the Forest of Skund. Meanwhile, the wizards of Ankh-Morpork use the Rite of Ashk-Ente to summon Death to find an explanation for the Octavo's actions. Death warns them that the Discworld will soon be destroyed by a huge red star unless the eight spells of the Octavo are read.

Several orders of wizards travel to the forest of Skund to try and capture Rincewind, who is currently staying with Twoflower and the Luggage in a gingerbread house in the forest. In the subsequent chaos, Rincewind and Twoflower escape on an old witch's broom, while the Archchancellor of Unseen University is killed when his attempt to obtain the spell accidentally summons the Luggage on top of him, crushing him to death. His apprentice, Ymper Trymon, uses the opportunity to advance his own power, intending to obtain the eight spells for himself.

Rincewind and Twoflower run into a group of druids who have assembled a "computer" formed from large standing stones, and learn of the approaching red star. As Twoflower attempts to stop the druids from sacrificing a young woman named Bethan, Cohen the Barbarian, an octogenarian parody of Conan, attacks the druids. Twoflower is poisoned in the battle, forcing Rincewind to travel to Death's Domain to rescue him. The pair narrowly avoid being killed by Ysabell, Death's adopted daughter, and as they escape Death's Domain, Rincewind learns from the Octavo itself that it had arranged for its eighth spell to escape into his head, to ensure the spells would not be used before the right time.

Rincewind and Twoflower travel with Cohen and Bethan to a nearby town, where the toothless Cohen leaves to have some dentures made for him, having learned of them from Twoflower. While he is gone, Rincewind, Twoflower and Bethan are attacked by a mob of people who believe the star is coming to destroy the Discworld in response to the presence of magic. The trio escape into one of many shops that sell strange and sinister goods and inexplicably vanish the next time a customer tries to find them.  The existence of these shops is explained as being a curse by a sorcerer upon the shopkeeper for not having something in stock. They are able to return to Ankh-Morpork via the shop.

As the star comes nearer and the magic on the Discworld becomes weaker, Trymon tries to put the seven spells still in the Octavo into his mind, in an attempt to save the world and gain ultimate power. However, the spells prove too strong for him and his mind becomes a door into the "Dungeon Dimensions", home to all manner of eldritch creatures. Rincewind and Twoflower manage to kill the now-mutated Trymon, and Rincewind reads all eight of the Octavo's spells aloud. This causes eight moons of the red star to crack open and reveal eight tiny world-turtles that follow their parent A'Tuin on a course away from the star. The Octavo then falls and is eaten by the Luggage.

Twoflower and Rincewind part company as Twoflower decides to return home, leaving the Luggage with Rincewind as a parting gift. Cohen and Bethan also leave to get married. Rincewind decides to re-enroll in the university, believing that with the spell out of his head, he will finally be able to learn magic.

Characters

Rincewind
Twoflower
the Luggage
Ymper Trymon
Cohen

Releases
The cover of a United States paperback release features a mistake, with Cohen's name stated to be "Conan".

Adaptations

Graphic novel
A graphic novel adapted by Scott Rockwell and illustrated by Steven Ross and Joe Bennet, was first published as a four-part comic in June, August, December 1992 and February 1993 by the Innovative Corporation of Wheeling WV, before being published as a single volume by Corgi on 4 November 1993. It has been published in hardcover along with the graphic novel of The Colour of Magic, as The Discworld Graphic Novels.

TV adaptation

The Mob Film Company and Sky One produced a miniseries, combining both The Colour of Magic and The Light Fantastic, broadcast on Easter Sunday and Monday 2008.  Sir David Jason played the part of Rincewind. He was joined by David Bradley as Cohen the Barbarian, Sean Astin as Twoflower, Tim Curry as Trymon, and Christopher Lee taking over the role of Death from Ian Richardson (a role he previously portrayed in the animated series Soul Music and Wyrd Sisters).

The production team wanted to get fans involved in the adaptation so some of the extras used in the adaptation (in mob scenes and during the fight in the Broken Drum) were Discworld fans who were selected via various website and Newsletters.

Reception
Dave Langford reviewed The Light Fantastic for White Dwarf #83, and stated that "Abandoning the cruel fantasy parodies of his previous book, Pratchett leans more heavily on the one-line gags: the result isn't as pointedly funny, but still evokes more laughs than anything else around. Especially Thrud."

Reviews
Review by Barbara Davies (1986) in Vector 134
Review by Pauline E. Dungate [as by Pauline Morgan] (1986) in Fantasy Review, November 1986
Review by Wendy Graham (1986) in Adventurer, December 1986
Review by Ken Lake (1986) in Paperback Inferno, #63
Review by Neil Gaiman and Wendy Graham (1987) in Adventurer, January 1987
Review by Don D'Ammassa (1987) in Science Fiction Chronicle, #97 October 1987
Review by John C. Bunnell (1988) in Dragon Magazine, July 1988
Review by James Cawthorn and Michael Moorcock (1988) in Fantasy: The 100 Best Books
Review [French] by Marc Lemosquet (1993) in Yellow Submarine, #106

References

External links

 
Pages at LSpace.org for The Light Fantastic : Annotations | Quotes | Synopsis

1986 British novels
Discworld books
1986 fantasy novels
British novels adapted into films
Novels adapted into comics
British novels adapted into television shows
British comedy novels